This episode list shows details of the 91 episodes of the BBC television series The Onedin Line.

Series 1

Series 2

Series 3

Series 4

Series 5

Series 6 

Broadcast 16 July – 17 September 1978, (10 episodes).

(E63)  

Written by: Mervyn Haisman.

The new series lead-in is an aerial shot of the Onedin Line's flagship Orlando, and cameo brooch vignettes of the lead actors.
Sir Daniel asks James to carry £100,000 of gold bullion from South Africa – off the books: he is liquidating his South African holdings for fear the country is becoming strife-ridden.

James charges 2% of the value of the cargo, jokingly throwing in a 'free passage' for Daniel who smiles. Baines jokes that James might as well run up the 'skull and cross bones', such is the size of the fee.
Josiah Beaumont (a new character) and the new head of Mr Harris's bank (he has sold his bank) calls. Twenty-year-old William suggests they dine at his club to discuss business.
Letty is trying to become pregnant and tells Elizabeth that she is concerned that she might be barren. Letty has also made a tapestry to put in place of Anne's picture.

Dunwoody tells Elizabeth that Mr Simmons (a client who has built 4 vessels with Frazers previously) has cancelled his order for a ship. To get the order William quoted low initially and then tried to push the price up with extras. Beaumont suggests that he can coerce Simmons to deal with Frazers. Elizabeth insults Beaumont for forcing Harris out and argues with William who says that Beaumont can be of tremendous help to them.

Meanwhile, James voyages home and the Panama canal – which will mean ships will no longer need sail to around the Horn of Africa – is an active idea although Baines regrets the loss of bravery in sailing that will ensue once difficult passages are avoided. A hazing ceremony on board sees a young boy shaven and tarred and feathered by a pirate Neptune.

Samuel has come home: also grown up. At a Bank party – quite unthinkable under Mr Harris - William confides to Samuel that his goal in 5 years is to be richer than any one in the room. Beaumont has convinced Simmons to have his new ship built with Frazers who tells Elizabeth that it is the last ship Frazers will be building for him. He tells Elizabeth that Beaumont threatened to take away his support if he had the ship built in another yard. On hearing this, she declares to Beaumont that she is dining with Mr Harris tomorrow night, 'such an upright man'! She leaves taking William with her. Later Samuel tells Letty about this and that within 5 minutes all the other guests had left as well.

A fire starts on board the Christian Radich – wool is burning. The fire is put out, but once again we learn that James is sailing under-insured.
Daniel discovers that three bars of gold have been stolen and James threatens a rope across the back of the man who has stolen the gold. However, one of the sailor points out that it is now against the law (recall that in series one merchant vessels sailed under Napoleonic Naval laws where mutiny or striking an officer was punishable by death). The young boy who was hazed previously has stolen the gold and confesses saying, "why should you have all that gold". The sailor who spoke out against flogging also speaks up for the boy and James lets him off saying that they can both crew a ship round the Horn and that the boy is now his responsibility.

The mate who found the gold beats Daniel to the deck, blaming him for stopping him marrying a rich Chinese girl some years earlier although apparently Daniel had saved him from sharks years before; he says they are now even.

As the episode closes, James bids for business with Fogarty against the Frazer line. James goes to put up a shield he has brought back from Africa only to see that Letty has replaced Anne's picture with her tapestry.

(E64)  

Written by: Cyril Abraham

On board the Neptune Baines asks how James got the contract for transporting steel plates instead of Frazers – "blood is thicker than water". "So is zinc", James replies, "and that is what contracts are made of". William's relations with Beaumont grow tighter, as he confides his dismay that Elizabeth and Daniel would not give the contract to "his" line. Petulant and demanding, he orders an old Captain to sea, and demands a fast passage, threatening him if he's slow, despite dense fog. Samuel grows increasingly unhappy at the future Robert has planned for him. Parents pass on what they have learned to their children, the children struggle to take on the role of their parents, un-aware of how little they know, but youthful and winning.
The Frazer ship that William has urged out to sea with Captain Oliphant in command passes a "red and white" buoy, but then they see a black and white buoy – they're on the wrong side of the channel and in the fog ram and sink James' ship the Neptune. All hands abandon ship but no lives are lost.

Lessons continue to be learned about honesty and decency. William applies more pressure on Oliphant and sends key witnesses from his own ship offshore. Sensing that Oliphant is weak he takes Beaumont's advice and has him sign a statement that he was on the correct side of the channel and that James was crossing in front of him thus binding him to this falsehood.
Again, the series is a lesson in the evolution of UK law as Robert tells Beaumont he has placed his house in his wife's name, protecting it from creditors.

Samuel is courting Charlotte, but she has only William on her mind. Robert and Sarah discuss a match between Charlotte and Samuel and both agree that it would ensure continuity of future 'family' business.

As the accusations fly, Oliphant finds himself in an impossible situation, caught between a rock and a hard place, and hangs himself. William has pangs of conscience and asks himself 'why'? – malevolent Beaumont tries to convince William it is a good thing and now renders Oliphant's testimony uncontestable. Robert points out that the dead cannot testify. James has realised that the location of the sunken steel plates and his anchor would be proof positive of the position of the two ships. The insurers agree and pay up.

Elizabeth is happy for William to learn that there is more to a company than money. Growing up means more than acquiring a moustache. They agree to pay Oliphant's dependents a 'modest' pension for life.

Shock ending...during a celebration dinner Robert gets a bone stuck in his throat and chokes to death in front of them.

(E65)  

Written by Nick McCarty

Following Robert's death, the will is read by Mr Andrews. Under the 1883 married women's property act, the house is Sarah's. However, there is a codicil stating that the department store is left to Samuel for as long as it is under his personal management; if not, it reverts to Sarah. A representative of the salvage company, Buxton, approaches James regarding the salvage of a ship, the Indian Queen, and its cargo of copper sheets. It is yet another ship under Captain Barry has foundered and claimed insurance and he suspects the owner, Mr Lynn, of double-dealing. Daniel and Samuel argue over a deal to buy a mill in Manchester, which he and Robert had agreed prior to his untimely death. Samuel says that he does not intend to honour it, as he was not part of the original arrangement. However, Samuel says that he plans to go ahead with Robert's parcel post service and Daniel agrees to supply the linen material for Letty to make the goods, which Samuel will sell via the catalogue.

James calls on Elizabeth and discusses insurance matters. Dunwoody also calls with some papers and confirms that William bought into part of the cargo that went down using Fraser company money. William tells Beaumont that he cannot afford to cover the claim if it is not settled.
James and Baines look for the Indian Queen, having learnt from the drunken captain that it went down a mile off Cromer Point and suspect it was deliberately sunk.

Elizabeth accuses William of using company money to buy the cargo and learns that if the transaction was illegal the insurance company will not pay.
Mr Lilly tells Beaumont that there was in fact no cargo on the ship, William joins them. The Indian Queen was an old ship and was scuttled with no cargo as the manifest was false. The copper sheets will be sold in due course as well as claiming the insurance money. William is warned not to breathe a word, as is Beaumont.

Letty voices her concerns about not being a mother; James says 'give it time'. The first mate of the Indian Queen arrives and tells James the truth about the Indian Queen and exactly where it went down. The diver is persuaded by Buxton to examine the hold, offering him 50 guineas and 100 guineas for his family if he is killed. The diver opens the hold discovering a dead man who was trapped. The escaped air dislodges the ship and it goes over a ledge into deep water; now they will not be able to prove whether there was a cargo on board.

James confronts William about the missing cargo and hands a shocked William the rosary of the man found dead in the ship saying 'keep it as a memento'.

(E66)  (compasses, theft, canals, mediumship) 

Written by: John Lucarotti

The episode (confusingly set in 1883, and the death of “that fellow Karl Marx who has just died”) opens with James explaining to Letty, who is gaining her sea legs, that their magnetic compass has deviated – paradoxically, because James' new two-masted ketch the Falcon is not carrying her normal cargo of steel plates – for which her compass has been calibrated with deviating magnets.

Daniel meets with Sir Norman – they discuss a £50,000 robbery in Manchester. Their main question is to break the Liverpool to Manchester transport monopoly of the Mersey docks, the harbor board and rail company. "The government will do nothing", suspects Daniel. Sir Norman retorts, "You wouldn't 'want' the government telling you how to run your business would you? We don't do things that way in this country, thank God!".  They briefly discuss the death of Karl Marx and anarchy.

Elizabeth suggests the canal as an alternative to the rail monopoly – Daniel pooh-poohs the idea as too slow (the canal was shut as rail replaces the horse), then realises that freight could be trafficked by steam in the canal... Elizabeth suggests they discuss it in bed. Cross cut, and Letty suggests James put his arms around her...

Talking to Sir Norman, Daniel expounds on his idea now: to tow the ocean going steamers up widened canal lanes all the way from the port of Liverpool to Manchester.

Samuel continues to develop his idea of parcel post (mail order) trading. An idea pioneered in the United States by Sears.

William continues to reveal himself to be a naïve and a more callous and less humane person than he had appeared.

James takes on a cargo with a Mr Jack Wadham, with no bills of lading required or desired. The Fennian strike and blowing up of a town hall motivate the cargo – transfer of a rich man's possessions.
Sarah begins seeing a medium – she becomes convinced through his simple predictions that he can see the future and is in contact with the dead Robert.

James suspects that Wadham and his cargo are not what they appear and opens the crates. Wadham discovers him and confesses that they are stolen and holds James and Baines at gunpoint. James pretends that they are on the wrong course by deviating the compass and having put up warning flags land at a cove in Wales. They are met by customs officers and Wadham is arrested while James sets sail again with £5000 in reward money. 'Not bad for one trip' says James!

(E67)  

Written by Douglas Watkinson

A gentleman, Murchison, is selling up his stores and ships including a schooner, the Jenny Peak. James is interested in the schooner but not the rest of the fleet. William has made a good offer. Letty confides to Elizabeth that she is pregnant, James doesn't know yet. Baines is told by the captain that the Norwegians are crying out for pianos. He says that he has a piano he can have for £10 and sell for £25 minimum. James tells Elizabeth that if she lets him take the schooner off her hands he will withdraw from the bidding. She says that Frazers have made no offer for the Murchison line. William has offered £26,000 and Beaumont says he has agreed to buy on his behalf.

Elizabeth tells Beaumont that Frasers has a reputation for honesty. Beaumont replies that the Fogarty yards are building several ships and Beaumont threatens to call in his loans. James bids for a Persian carpet and buys it for 28 guineas showing it to Letty who tries to tell James she is pregnant. William apologises to Elizabeth and says that it is time to find a place of his own, she agrees. James offers to sell Samuel the warehouse he is buying at Murchison Quay for £3000. Samuel plans to sell salmon to hotels and James offers to supply ice for storage as he is going to Norway. James tells Daniel he would be a fool not to buy the Murchison Line, as it is part of the South African Conference. 

William and Charlotte meet at his new apartment, Letty waits up and tells her that Lucy has tonsillitis, so where were you? Charlotte says she was with William but they only kissed, however Letty notices that Charlotte's pearls are missing and suspects that more has transpired. James, Beaumont and William meet; James says he only wants the schooner and will withdraw if he gets it for a fair price.

James meets Murchison who says that he does not only want the money but wants to leave a legacy behind, as he has no sons. Daniel tells William that Beaumont is using him and that he will not have his wife threatened. He tells Beaumont that Murchison is transferring his loan to another bank and if Beaumont sets foot in the office again, he will run the Fraser line down to nothing.

James bargains for ice in Norway and Baines discovers that he has been taken for a fool with the piano. Baines finds a crewmember after he has been mugged and robbed, they go back to the bar and find who did it and make them buy the piano as retribution, for £26. Unloading it, they deliberately drop it on the quay.

At home, James hurries back to Daniel to find out about the schooner, the Jenny Peak. Baines tells Jack about the piano and spins a yarn and Jack takes the bait. James tells Letty that he is renaming the Jenny Peak the Letty Gaunt.

(E68)  

Written by Simon Masters

Daniel shows the plans for the Liverpool to Manchester ship canal to Sir Norman and his business partners, noting that the Railway monopoly will fight them all the way. Meanwhile, the ladies discuss the latest fashion in the room next door; Elizabeth is extremely bored by the small talk and is concerned with what Daniel may be negotiating. He says that the canal will cost £10m to build but is a 'small' investment to make for future prosperity. Elizabeth says that she was born and bred in Liverpool and accuses Daniel of being a traitor for the effect the canal will have on the shipyards. She says it will be the death of Liverpool.

James tells Letty, who has still not told him she is pregnant, to come to Africa with him.  Still not willing to tell him she is pregnant, she says that she cannot because she has bought a shredding machine and 'has to be there when it is delivered'!  A man called Branigan, clutching his daughter, is evicted to release land for the canal. A Reverend Webster asks Baines if they can take them to Lagos. He knows James as they are related through Anne and are in fact cousins. In an orphanage, Sarah sees Branigan and his daughter and pledges all her help. Daniel tells Elizabeth that the South African Conference has thrown out the Murchison Line.  

Branigan signs on as ships carpenter while Sarah introduces Marcus Symmons, the director of the orphanage, to Elizabeth. They need new premises and benefactors. He flatters Elizabeth and says he needs 3–4 thousand pounds. James shows Hannah Webster around the ship and Baines looks on with slight concern, as Letty is not on the voyage. Elizabeth invites Marcus Symmons to dine with her and says that he interests her and does he try to seduce women for profit or pleasure. Symmons shows her the orphanage which has no heat or sanitation and that he would flatter any woman to get what he needs. On board ship, Branigan tells Hannah Webster about his daughter and she berates him for abandoning her, much to Baines annoyance, who says it is none of her business.

Letty confides in Elizabeth that she has still not told James. Elizabeth tells Daniel that she has been entertaining herself with a young man and that a girl has been thrown out of her home because of the canal, making them beggars. Daniel denies it and says someone else is buying the land.
The crew are sick due to foul water and put in for fresh supplies. Daniel suspects someone of cheating the company and buying the land near the locks to resell at an exorbitant profit. He has the name of the company and accuses Sir Norman who admits it but says it will not stand up in court. Daniel says that he will use all his wealth to prove it unless Norman agrees to sell the land to them at the same price he paid for it.

While they are at anchor waiting for fresh water, the ship is boarded by bandits. James and the crew fend off the attackers and Branigan saves Hannah's life. James tells Branigan that when they return he will give him enough money for a new start.

(E69)  

Written by Mervyn Haisman

James returns from Africa after 2 months away and finds Letty 6 months pregnant. He is furious not only with not being told but also because he does not want any more children. He storms out. William also learns that Charlotte is pregnant much to his dismay but she assumes they will marry now he is 21. James comes back drunk and apologises and Baines says it was his fault but he thought it would take James' mind off things. Elizabeth and Daniel argue once again over his plans for the ship canal while they learn that Sir Norman Truscott is to apply for The Chiltern Hundreds. 

Charlotte tells Samuel that William has asked her to marry him while William confides in Beaumont. He says that James' wrath will not last forever but marriage will and advises against. James sails to Ireland and once again finds Samuel on board who requests a passage as he is considering providing ships furnishings. At his 21st birthday party, Elizabeth presents William with the title deeds to the Fraser Line and yards and a gold fob watch. Beaumont arrives and insults Elizabeth, Daniel tells him never to do that again or he will regret it. Beaumont advises them both not make an enemy of him or they will regret it; they both leave the party. Charlotte has given William a ring but his says he cannot accept it and that he cannot marry her. She is distraught. 

At sea, James comes across an abandoned steamer. He and Samuel board her and find high explosives in the hold as well as leaking nitroglycerine. After much wheeler dealing, Beaumont brokers a deal to sell the yard for £205,000, the yard being William's now he is 21. Charlotte tells Letty that William won't marry her and that she is going to have a baby. James and Samuel put the leaking explosive over the side and one box explodes. A steam launch approaches and they are told the cargo is government property and is to remain secret. James tells them about the leaking nitroglycerine and threatens to leave unless a salvage deal is agreed. The captain concedes and says how much? James says: 'let's talk about it'.

(E70)  
Written by Douglas Watkinson

James has sent Baines to bring back a ship, the Amarillos. The captain, an old enemy of Baines, is dying. His wife, Catherine, pleads with Baines to take him back to Liverpool to die. At home, James comments that Charlotte is putting on weight. William learns that Beaumont has sold the yard and has given an acre of land to William as a bonus and tells him that he is to stand for city councillor. James learns about Beaumont's ambitions and Samuel wants James to sponsor Daniel to stand against him. 

Letty tells Elizabeth, who says that it would conflict with his role as director of the ship canal project. Catherine tells Baines that she will soon be a rich widow and asks for his advice. Samuel confronts William over his refusal to marry Charlotte and they fight, both of them the worse for wear as a result. James confronts Charlotte and Letty tells him the truth – James calls her a trollop and says that William will damn well marry her. James confronts Elizabeth who defends William and James says that she is a fine one to talk. William again refuses to accept his responsibilities and Daniel strikes an already battered William across the face. 

Captain Robert Bragg is buried at sea and Catherine asks Baines if he can recommend a reliable captain for the Amarillos, which she has now inherited and plans to keep. Baines is obviously attracted to her but recommends a captain Blake telling Catherine that he would be too set in his ways and rough and ready for her. Letty tells Charlotte that she is to go to Aunt Mary's for a 'holiday', after which the baby will be adopted. She says that she never wants to see it. 

Back in Liverpool James boards the Amarillos and tells Baines that he has bought the ship from Bragg for £3000 in a deal arranged before they set sail and that he will arrange a proper draft of the money for Catherine. She declares to Baines: 'that was a lot of speculation about nothing' but that she hopes they can see each other from time to time.

(E71)  

Written by Simon Masters

A Mr Mcormack boards James' ship in Ireland; he is from Lloyds and wants to examine the ship to make sure it is 'tight, staunch and strong'. He is not satisfied, and a Mr O'malley from the Board of Trade also wants to examine the ship after complaints from the crew and the cargo of spuds is unloaded. 

Beaumont tells William that he wants to raise Liverpool like a phoenix from the ashes and that he will reward anyone who goes with him. Elizabeth schemes and asks Marcus Symmons to run against Daniel. Daniel learns of this and asks where his financial backing is coming from. William tells Beaumont about Daniels involvement in the ship canal and what it will mean to Liverpool. James realises that he has been tricked into letting his cargo go and sets sail for Liverpool with only he and Baines as crew. Daniel asks Elizabeth if she has heard of Portside Holdings and, under pressure from Elizabeth, William tells her that he has seen these documents in Beaumont's office. Elizabeth says that if they tell the papers about Beaumont's plans he will be crucified. On reading the newspaper headlines decrying him, Beaumont says 'may you burn in hell forever' and tells William that Daniel has earned his undying enmity. 

Symmons becomes a City Councillor and Daniel announces, to Elizabeth's shock, that he has accepted the nomination to stand as parliamentary candidate for 'Manchester'. Letty goes into labour and James arrives in time for the birth of a son. His joy is short-lived when the doctor tells him that the baby is unlikely to survive more than a few days.

(E72)  

Written by Cyril Abraham

The episode opens 10 days after the funeral of James and Letty's baby son. They are both grieving but unable to comfort each other. Elizabeth and Sarah try to help Letty but she's not interested until she hears that her business is having problems. Letty persuades James to go to sea: 'it would be best for both of us'. One of Letty's employees brings a map to Letty of the harbour front. Beaumont is implicated in buying up land to sell to the harbour board at a huge profit. Samuel visits Letty and tells her and Sarah that he has asked Charlotte to marry him. He says that if they don't give permission they will elope. They marry in a quiet ceremony. 

Daniel tells Elizabeth that Sir Joshua Thackery has died meaning there will be a bye election for the Manchester ward which he should win. To please Elizabeth he shows her his letter of resignation from the ship canal project to which Elizabeth replies 'I do love you'. They go to see William when Beaumont is there and tell William what is going on. Elizabeth tells William that the amount offered by Beaumont, £300,000, for the yard is nowhere near enough and that she and Daniel will match the offer. William decides not to sell the yard to either of them. Beaumont leaves swearing that 'for as long as he lives he will make it his business to ruin Daniel'. 

Elizabeth tells William that he is to go abroad for a year and they will run the Fraser Line until he returns. Meanwhile, James is sailing to Africa. A passenger, Mr Peterson, tells him a tale about untold riches in a very dangerous area marked by a white mast. They land and the ship stands off at a safe distance away from the reef. Peterson shows them that the mast sticking out of the sand is in fact that of a sunken galleon. It has gold and diamonds in its hold. He was there the previous year with two partners who died in the earlier attempt.

He takes them to where he began digging but suddenly a storm blows up so James and Baines take shelter. When the storm abates, they find Peterson dead, the mast of the galleon having fallen on him. James realises that their ship won't find them as they were using the mast to take bearings. However, discovering parts of the Osprey on the beach they realise that it must have been wrecked on the reef during the storm. They find an old rowing boat and set off into the shipping lanes, drifting for days, reminiscing about the past and fearing the worst. James now calls Baines by his Christian name, Will.

At home, the Osprey has finally been posted as missing and Letty is distraught. Charlotte goes into labour and gives birth to a son. Suddenly there is a scream from a servant and James walks in saying 'you look like you've seen a ghost'. He and Letty embrace. James says that he and Baines were finally picked up by a steamer, which has taken 6 weeks to return. The episode finishes with the christening of the new baby, who has been named Robert Baines Onedin. Baines is to be godfather.

Series 7 

Broadcasts 22 July – 23 September 1979, (10 episodes).

(E73)  

Written by Mervyn Haisman

Two years have passed and James and Letty have been away at sea on the Christian Radich for six months. Letty is bored and wants to go home. They come across a couple adrift in a small boat, a Professor Dawson and his daughter Emma. At home, Elizabeth uses a new communications device called a telephone. She and Daniel have not seen each other for 3 months and all is not well between Charlotte and Samuel. Professor Dawson has been in Egypt excavating the tomb of Neferhotep and is zealously protecting a bag containing a mysterious object. It transpires that they have been on a dhow, which was transporting lepers to Crete. James isolates them in their cabin and Emma develops a fever. 

Elizabeth goes to London to see Daniel and surprises him in his apartment with the daughter of Lord Talbot. William has sent a letter to Charlotte asking to call on her when he returns from Nice. Samuel says no and declares that he will never allow him in his house. Emma fears that the content of the bag is causing her fever and Dawson throws it over the side. Within minutes her fever breaks. It contained the mummified head of a young boy and Dawson says that he was told that anyone taking it would be cursed. Charlotte reads William's letter asking for forgiveness. 

James shows Letty their new house. It is a mansion with 12 bedrooms when she was expecting a small villa. She is very unhappy and James declares: 'damn it woman is there no pleasing you'!

(E74)  
Written by Mervyn Haisman

The episode opens with Baines engaged in a fight (Baines having been accused of cheating at cards) on the quay ending up with a broken arm. A Captain Burgess intervenes and patches him up. James reprimands Baines and says that a spell ashore will do him good including time spent on the floor of The Exchange. William calls on Charlotte but is turned away. He talks to Samuel on the floor of The Exchange and is told to stay away from Charlotte or he will 'horsewhip him in public'. 

Elizabeth tells Dunwoody, who is playing an increasingly important role in the company, that she plans to go away for a holiday and that they need to discuss his salary and position. In an attempt to save their marriage, Daniel asks Elizabeth to go horse riding with him. She declines only to change her mind and return home to find Daniel on the telephone telling his mistress, Angela Taplow, not to call him at his house. Captain Burgess looks for Baines with a bottle of whiskey but finds James instead and they discuss business over a glass or two. James points out that Burgess' ship has been impounded and offers a partnership to pay off the debts on his steamer, the Black Pearl. 

William encounters Charlotte walking with her pram and asks to see his son but she refuses telling him that she despises him. At the quay in a shock ending to the episode William makes an heroic attempt to stop a runaway carriage. He succeeds saving many lives but is thrown off hitting his head and is killed. Charlotte is bereft telling Samuel that it would have been such a simple thing to have let him see his son. After the funeral Daniel is set to return to London in a few hours, however Elizabeth says 'walk with me in the garden' hinting at a reconciliation.

(E75)  
Written by Douglas Watkinson

On the quay, a gentleman called Orsova and his wife asks where he can find 'Paddy West'. Because of Baines' broken arm, a notorious Captain Blake will be in charge of the voyage to New York. On learning this several of the crew have jumped ship. Paddy West arranges passages to America for criminals and individuals with dubious backgrounds who need to avoid immigration on Ellis Island, for a fee. The owner of the Black Pearl, Seth Burgess, asks Paddy West to find him seven crewmen for the voyage. West assumes they are for Burgess' steam ship. West tricks Burgess into believing the men are experienced saying that one of them has been round the Horn twice; he in fact walked twice around a table with a 'horn' on it. 

Elizabeth has promoted Dunwoody to Managing Director and plans to go on holiday. Sarah tells Elizabeth about her psychic and that he has foretold that Elizabeth will be 'provided for'. Burgess points out that the contract Baines has signed to deliver traction engines won't work as there will be no heavy lifting gear at the port. A solicitor, Mr Pettifer, arrives looking for a Robert Onedin. William has left a large legacy for his son Robert amounting to £20,000. Elizabeth remembers what Sarah told her about being 'provided for'. Seth Burgess shows Elizabeth his plans to replace piston engines with a new design of turbine similar to the reaction turbine patented by Sir Charles Parsons. She says she will show it to her chief draughtsman and Seth suggests dinner to discuss it. On board the Christian Radich another criminal attempts to kill James but his life is saved by Orsova who reveals that he and his wife are a Count and Countess fleeing from Rumelia and that she is pregnant.

At home, Baines goes looking for Paddy West and Elizabeth calls on Burgess saying that she is interested in his ideas. She accepts his invitation to dinner, introducing him to Letty and Sarah who will also be joining them. Burgess tells Elizabeth about Baines' problem and she agrees to provide a ship with lifting gear for £250. Baines beats West in an arm wrestling contest winning back the £35 fee for the 'Paddy Westers' with James saying, 'back to sea for you where you'll keep out of mischief'.

(E76)  

Written by: Nick McCarty

The episode opens with Elizabeth out riding. She is splattered with mud by another rider, a Viscount Marston (played by Maurice Colbourne later to be the star of Howards Way). Lady Elizabeth sets to sea, Dunwoody having pinched a cargo of "mining equipment" from under James' nose. Baines signs a sailor with his mate's ticket who reveals that Elizabeth is likely carrying a cargo of guns – James sets sail to catch her steamer and let her know. Elizabeth's ship is making 12 knots so James will have his work cut out. A fast clipper like Cutty Sark would make 17 knots.

On land, James' new steamer, the Black Pearl, is still laid up and can't be certified by Lloyd's. The boiler needs replacing, he needs £1200 for a half share, £600 to bail out Burgess's debts, and £500 for the new boiler: James ponders the wisdom of his deal and dealing with Burgess.

After the mate falls out of the rigging, James stakes him in his gold mining quest in the Transvaal for 50 guineas receiving 10% of any profit in return.

Elizabeth has coaled at Jarvis Bay. Charlotte's romantic disdain for business and desire for love sees her increasingly unhappy with life with Samuel and her eyes wander to more exciting and doting men, including Seth Burgess.
Letty is shocked to learn that one of her sweatshop girls has quit her factory work to become a prostitute – swapping 15 shillings (£0.75) a week for hard work for £4 a week on her back.

James has spotted Elizabeth, but how to stop her? At daylight, James flies a bogus distress flag (against every rule of the sea).  The cargo is guns, secreted beneath a layer of mining equipment. James offers to find a customer for the guns at £1 a piece. Elizabeth is unsure what to do and asks for £2. James agrees thinking that he can get £6 selling them to the government at the Cape. The Major refuses threatening to alert the authorities if James does not hand them over. James is £1000 out of pocket and Lady Elizabeth is home free. Baines chuckles to himself as James writhes at the loss.

(E77)  
Written by Roger Parkes

The episode opens with a young lad, Tom, asking Baines for work. A Senor De Silva calls on James to carry a valuable cargo to the Azores. Letty suggests that Samuel give Charlotte an allowance to give her independence. He tells Charlotte that he is giving her £3000 and his 15% share of Onedin shares. She is overwhelmed. She asks him to go to London with her to see the exhibition of inventions and that she has invited Seth Burgess to dinner to discuss business. Samuel declines saying that he is too busy and Charlotte storms out. Charlotte later entertains Burgess alone. 

On board the Thorsoe, a crewman 'Glasgow' McDade plots to steal some of De Silva's cargo and involves the lad Tom. The bosun queries the loading of the ship and the amount of sail saying that they are against new procedures. Baines replies that his only law is 'to honour and obey' him. Elizabeth suggests that due to their mutual circumstances she and Sarah should live together in one house. A gentleman delivers an expensive riding coat for Elizabeth, a present from a Viscount Marston who splattered her with mud while out riding recently. 

'Glasgow' gets Tom to get the keys to the hold from James' cabin and steals some of De Silva's valuables threatening Tom to keep quiet or else. The bosun discovers them and Glasgow stabs him to death throwing his body overboard. They are questioned by James and swear on the Bible, saying that the Bosun was drunk and fell overboard. Baines suspects the boy is lying to protect himself. Burgess calls on Charlotte and persuades her to invest £2000 in the Black Pearl. He later reveals his true nature when he tells a mate that he plans to disappear abroad with the money. McCabe and his partner are finally arrested after James discovers the stolen items and sets sail with Baines and Tom as crew telling Baines to let Tom take the helm.

(E78)  
Written by Roger Parkes

At the quayside, Burgess tells James that he has the money to buy back his half of the Black Pearl as a result of a bequest from a relative. At home, Letty finds a baby abandoned on her doorstep. She tells Elizabeth that it is a foundling, a result of one of her employees indulging in a 'more profitable' trade. Charlotte gives the cash to Burgess for her share of the Black Pearl who says that he will be sailing to the Mediterranean to generate business. Samuel and Charlotte go to Elizabeth's ball and Charlotte gets very drunk. Viscount Charles Marston arrives and Elizabeth 'accidentally' spills her drink on him, to which he replies 'touché'! Samuel argues with Charlotte who flounces out of the ball. 

She takes the rest of her money and her Onedin shares, packs her bags and goes to the quay to look for Burgess. She finds him and says that they are kindred spirits and that she wants to go with him, to which he finally agrees. Letty tries to persuade Samuel to go after her but he says 'let her go'. When James learns about Charlotte and Burgess, he is absolutely furious, vowing to offer rewards in every port to anyone who finds them. 

The owner of the orphanage, who has taken over from Simmons, tells Letty that he can't take the foundling because of its background and that it may carry infections. Letty threatens to withdraw her patronage if he refuses. She later tells James that she wants to set up her own orphanage to which James replies 'it's your money'. She replies, 'I do love you'

(E79)  
Written by Simon Masters

James learns that Elizabeth has won a contract that he thought was his. He erupts with anger and clutches his stomach. The doctor says that James has an ulcer and prescribes a milk and fish diet and rest. He says that if the ulcer bursts on board ship he can't guarantee his return. James says that it is nothing that a sea breeze can't put right. Elizabeth tells James that she declined the contract. 

Charles Marston arrives at James' office. He says a passenger called Bullen has sailed on one of James' ships and he is very keen to trace him. He asks James to send a cable instructing Bullen to be kept on board once they dock. He says he cheated him out of a considerable amount of money on a timber contract. He tells James that he bought Imperial Staffs recently and is to let a contract to carry his clay every month. It transpires that he was the one who offered the contract to Elizabeth and that if James gives him Bullen he can have the contract. 

On board ship, Bullen rescues Tom the cabin boy from a mad crewmember. At home Sarah introduces her friend, a retired naval captain called Arbuthnot Dampier (played by Patrick Troughton, the second Doctor Who) to her family. Samuel disapproves. Dampier says that he inherited an estate and owns a steam yacht called Amazon (the yacht used in filming was, in fact, the ex-steam yacht Amazon). James says that at least he has an estate so he can't be after Sarah's money, which was all that worried him. 

Tom shows Baines the cable saying Bullen is wanted for thieving. Sarah tells Dampier that her medium, Pilgrim, has told her that her late husband Robert objects to him. Dampier and later James confront Pilgrim offering him money or threatening him with exposure and legal action as a fraud. Marston says he needs to find a way of tempting Elizabeth and invites her to tender to deliver an entire railway system for Chile right through the Andes. He invites her to Clitheroe Castle for a hunt but she says she has been tempted enough for one day. 

On board the Amazon, Samuel accuses Sarah of insulting the memory of his father. James learns that Bullen has skipped ship at Liverpool with the help of Tom and Baines says he is not sorry because he could not make him out as a thief. Bullen returns and demands to know who is accusing him. He was owed several months wages and says that he was told by the old man who owned the estate in Cheshire to take whatever was of use, so he started felling timber. The old mans nephew is a certain Captain Dampier who tells James that as far as he was aware there was an unwritten understanding with Bullen. Dampier reveals that the estate was bankrupt and James orders him to withdraw from his relationship with Sarah giving him cheques from both himself and Elizabeth to fund his steamer. Dampier says he is sorry but that he would really have cared for Sarah. 

Marston signs the clay-shipping contract only to find that Bullen is now in mid Atlantic. Marston says that James will never get another contract from him. James says that as far as he is concerned Bullen is innocent and that is his word as gentleman. Marston replies that he sees no gentlemen in the room to which Baines agrees, saying he sees no gentlemen either, and that he is glad he is a simple sailor.

(E80)  
Written by Simon Masters

Charlotte is on board the Black Pearl reading a book in the heat of Figueira. James tells Baines that she can't just have vanished. Letty looks at a site for her orphanage. Marston asks Elizabeth for a favour to deliver a special case of port from Gibraltar for someone's birthday. She agrees saying he can use the Mersey Maiden. Neighbours tell Letty that they are not happy with her orphanage. 

A Mr. Barber callously declares that the best thing any loose woman getting herself pregnant could do is throw the baby in the Mersey. They also approach James saying is there no a financial constraint he can apply. He says he does not take kindly to being told what to do and that anyway it is her own money. The Mersey Maiden is laid up in Figueira awaiting a new prop shaft. 

Elizabeth asks James if he can help as a favour but he refuses, to which she replies, 'I hope you never need a favour from me'. Elizabeth tells Marston to trust her that she will have the port back in time for his father's 70th birthday. Elizabeth tells James that she has been told that the Black Pearl is in Figueira and he immediately agrees to sail and pick up the port for Marston. She receives a bunch of red roses from Marston, he telephones her but she leaves a message that she is not at home. 

James arrives to find that the Black Pearl has sailed for Madeira. Elizabeth arrives home to find Marston there. He says he worships her and that they are a match; they kiss. James comes across a ship in need of medical help. Marston shows Elizabeth a letter from James asking him to persuade Lord Hawkmoor, who is a friend of his, to sell his property to Letty, otherwise the port may be involved in scenes similar to the Boston Tea Party. The injured crewman develops gangrene so James agrees to turn back to Lisbon. The man tells James that he was drinking with Burgess and he is in fact sailing to the Mediterranean.

James returns home and Letty tells him that she is to buy the house after all and that it is due to Viscount Marston. The episode ends with Samuel drunk in bed with an actress.

(E81)  
Written by Cyril Abraham

A bored Charlotte strums a guitar on board the Black Pearl. Burgess says they are safe in the Mediterranean and that there are only two ways out, the Suez Canal or Gibraltar. Samuel wakes up with a hangover in the house of a Fergus Doyle and his actress daughter Helen who he was with the previous evening. Letty shows James her new orphanage and he offers a paltry donation of 50 guineas. Helen's father is looking for a backer for his new play. Charles Marston declares his love for Elizabeth and says that he wants to marry her, offering to talk to her husband Daniel. 

Marston's father visits Elizabeth suggesting that she is not suitable for him, as a divorce would ruin both their names and reputations. James tracks down the Black Pearl in Cyprus. He boards the ship and confronts Burgess offering to trade Charlotte for the Black Pearl. He agrees and a furious Charlotte leaves with James. Mr Doyle gives Sarah a rendition of his new play and floats the idea of 'someone' funding it. 

Letty arrives declaring that James has found Charlotte and Samuel and Helen exchange glances. An emotional Charlotte tells James that she is sorry she killed her mother by being born. On the way home, a rope breaks and Charlotte is hit on the head by a pulley block and knocked overboard. She is rescued by Tom and James but has a bad injury and has lost a lot of blood. Samuel says that he won't lose Helen and wants her for his wife. Charlotte is brought home and Samuel starts to speak saying he married her because he was sorry for her. She turns and he sees her scarred face. Letty and James leave and Samuel tells Charlotte they must talk about their future.

(E82)  
Written by Cyril Abraham

James and Baines tell Tom that he should become indentured as an apprentice to be a ship's master. He says that it will cost £50 plus his uniform, however James and Baines agree to act as surety and waive the fee. James gives him a uniform and Baines gives him a sextant. He is overjoyed. Tom falls asleep on the Black Pearl and Burgess boards it and sets sail with James in pursuit. Tom pretends to join in with them and says it's no skin off his nose which master he serves.
 
Samuel tells Charlotte he wants a divorce but she begs for forgiveness saying she will never let him go. On board the Black Pearl Tom puts sand in the engine bearings and jumps ship in a skiff that he has filled with provisions. 

At home, Dunwoody tells Elizabeth that Daniel has been appointed Turkish Ambassador and as the wife of a Minister Plenipotentiary she will be expected to join him. Sarah schemes to keep Samuel and Charlotte together suggesting that Doyle should take his play, and his daughter, to America and that she will back him for £1500. She says she will be on the quay to wave him bon voyage and hand over the cheque.

James finds Tom who has been at sea for 3 days. He says that he knows exactly where the Black Pearl is. When they find it, Burgess says that they will have to take it over his dead body. His crew refuse to fight with him and James says if he wants the steamer that much 'leave him be' much to Baines' bemusement. Charles Marston's father confronts Elizabeth saying that if she does not end her relationship with his son it is within his gift to revoke Daniels new appointment. 

James arrives home with Tom and finds his house full of children from Letty's orphanage, which has burnt down. James says he is going back to the ship for some peace and quiet. Letty says he is so stubborn to which he replies 'always have been, always will be'.

Series 8 

Broadcast 31 August – 26 October 1980, (9 episodes).

(E83)  
Written by Barry Thomas

The final series opens with Elizabeth returning from Constantinople greeted by Dunwoody and helped with her baggage by a stranger. Mrs Gibson tells James that the builder called. We learn that Letty died 3 months ago and that it was her last wish that the house be well maintained. James speaks to Samuel on the phone; he is obviously uncomfortable with the new technology and speaks very loudly. He has had another argument with Charlotte. Elizabeth has borrowed to her limits to fund her new steamer and will not seek help from Daniel. She asks Samuel to lend her £15000. She asks Mrs Gibson how James has been since Letty's death and we learn that she caught diphtheria from one of the children in her orphanage. Charlotte says that the divorce case is soon to go to court and that Samuel will get custody of the children. James walks in the garden with the stranger that Elizabeth met at the station, a Mr Borovec.  James enquires after the other passenger and Borovec tells him that he will know him when he boards. James agrees a fee of £3000 for the two passengers. Samuel has put himself up for President of the Chamber of Commerce and is worried about the effect the divorce may have on this. To cut costs James proposes an amalgamation of the Fraser and Onedin lines to Elizabeth and asks her to think about it. Mrs Gibson calls on the phone and Elizabeth answers 'Liverpool 5'.  She tells James that a visitor has called for him at his house.  Sir Gerald from the Foreign Office tells James that Prince Alexander of Bulgaria has been forced to abdicate by the Tsar of Russia who wants to appoint a puppet to do his bidding and that the mysterious passenger will be Prince Alexander. On board the Soren Larsson, Elizabeth tells James that she saw Borovec in the Russian Embassy in Constantinople talking to the Tsar and fears that the Prince's life may be in danger. Two of the seamen discuss being bribed £50 each and £50 when 'the job' is done. The Prince narrowly escapes being killed by a block and tackle thrown by a man in the rigging and dives in after him after he falls, rescuing him. Later in remorse the seaman confesses to Baines.  At home, the Liverpool Echo carries the headline 'Prominent Liverpool businessman in divorce case'. Charlotte does not fight the case offering no defence and they are divorced. James arrives in Bulgaria and the party row ashore to a riverbank. Several horsemen arrive taking Tom hostage. Borovec disguises himself as Prince Alexander and is shot and killed. Tom is freed and the attackers leave presuming the Prince to be dead. He bids James goodbye and sets off inland alone.

(E84)  
Written by Simon Masters

James decides that instead of leaving Bulgaria he will stay and pick up a cargo of tobacco. He has heard that the Danube is flooded so it cannot go by the usual route. He and Baines set off inland to pick up the tobacco on the backs of donkeys. Tom and another crewman wait on the dock. They see a group of men take over the ship as it lies waiting. Tom decides to go after James and Baines. Meanwhile, James picks up the tobacco and sets off back for the ship. They find the track is blocked and suddenly they are attacked. They are both knocked out and when they come to they find themselves prisoners in a castle. They are then told that they are being held hostage. James finds out that the whole thing with the tobacco was a trick just to get him inland. Elizabeth is at home and receives a visit from a government official who tells her that the brigands want £50,000 for James' release. He says the government cannot help so it is up to the family to raise the money. Elizabeth sells some of her shares in the Frazer line. Samuel lends her £10,000 and Charlotte sells some of the Onedin Line ships. Elizabeth and Samuel set off for Bulgaria with the ransom.

Meanwhile, James digs a hole in the fireplace. Tom arrives at the castle and can hear the noise of him digging. When James breaks through, he sees Tom in the chimney. They escape and set off for the coast, regaining the ship. Elizabeth and Samuel meet up with the brigands and hand over the ransom. They go back to the steamer and sail for the cove where, they have been told, James will be waiting. The two ships meet and Elizabeth boards the Onedin ship. When James finds out that they paid the ransom, he is furious, shouting "you nincompoops even I would not have paid £50,000 for me!"

(E85)  
Written by Nick McCarty

James takes a woman passenger on board, Margarita Juarez, the President's daughter, Tom gives her a whistle. What may be an old Morgan Cannon (named after Sir Henry Morgan) is brought on board. Margarita learns from Tom that James' wife is dead. She tells James not to feel guilty at his loss- he says 'I'm 47 years old, have a difficult daughter and go home to a cold house, not much at my age'. He tells her that he has built and almost lost an empire but regrets that he never allowed Letty to share it with him. Margarita and James are obviously becoming attracted to each other. Gavrialides warns James not to unload his cargo, as there is no money to pay for it. James visits the President who tells him that he may soon be overthrown and to take his daughter away with him. James and Tom smuggle Margarita out from under the rebels nose but are too late to get to the ship before Baines sets sail. They escape into a small rowing boat but are fired on by the rebels. Baines orders the mate Turner to try firing the Morgans cannon. They succeed in knocking out the rebels' stronghold but Turner is killed in the blast. James asks Margarita what she wants to do to which she replies, 'you decide'. James says 'we'll go home then'.

(E86)  
Written by Barry Thomas

James and Margarita have married, but Elizabeth is not happy. James has decided to go the East Indies to find cargo to solve their financial problems. The main problem is that the Dutch have a monopoly there. He plans to go to Sumatra and asks Margarita to go with him as a honeymoon. He leaves Elizabeth to buy two old ships to store tobacco in the East Indies and to start a new company and raise £20,000 to do so. She asks Samuel but he refuses saying that he has no money as his mills are on strike. At the dock, Captain Baines is signing on crew and turns away a union man. Margarita tells James that this will deprive his family so James tells Baines to hire him. He also engages a bosun that everyone hates, they say that every voyage he does someone dies. He is a brutal man. They arrive in Sumatra and meet Max Van De Rheede a shipping owner living there. He is very charming to Margarita.

James meets Max's customers and undercuts his prices. They also meet Max's brother Theodore. James sets sail to Java to get custom there but Max believes that he won't succeed because the Dutch have all the business. Later Max tells his brother that James has ruined them and they will have to leave Sumatra. Meanwhile, at home Elizabeth tells Mr Dawkins and Mr Dunwoody that the company James has created is called Rotterdam Onedin and has 40% Dutch shareholders, this has enabled him to trade in The East Indies.
When they arrive home, Elizabeth greets them and says she has a surprise dinner guest. It turns out to be Max. He tells them all that his brother killed himself because they had to leave and that he is starting a company in Liverpool.

(E87)  
Written by Roger Parkes

Elizabeth and Dunwoody attend an auction of some of their ships and bid for the Sea Spray. They are outbid by Captain Baines, aided financially by Tom who offers his life savings of £45. Elizabeth had thought he was bidding for it on behalf of James who says he would have gone there himself if he had known. James tells Margarita that he is going to Niger alone to set up a trading post, she replies seductively, 'say goodbye properly'! In return for his investment Baines gives Tom six shares in the Sea Spray; they are now partners. James wants to sail immediately but it's Friday and Baines says to wait until tomorrow, James declares 'Jonah's Luck'. Samuel and Max Van Der Rheede discuss the sale of a warehouse on the East River in New York. Der Rheede wants £11000 for it; Samuel agrees but pays for it by giving him the note he holds against James' debt. In Niger, James goes up river to meet Reverend Stoner and the chief and bargain for ivory. At home, Margarita wanders the streets of Liverpool and is attacked and robbed. She comments on the pitiful conditions some of the people live in and Elizabeth says she should take over running the orphanage following Letty's death to which Margarita replies, 'Letty, Letty, Letty!' James offers to build the trading post in return for all their ivory and accepts a drinking challenge with the evil Nkasa who says that Baines will be ill, Tom will die in a fire and James' wife will be ill. The potions strength is first tested on a goat, which dies. James goes first but secretly makes himself sick and survives. Nkasa refuses to drink and James wins. Baines is unhappy with James' double-dealing with Reverend Stoner and Samuel. James confronts Baines for buying the Sea Spray for himself. Baines declares he wants nothing more to do with him saying 'you can walk your own path to hell James Onedin'.

(E88)  
Written by Roger Parkes

Back in Liverpool, Tom tells Baines it's not too late to settle his argument with James, but Baines says that he has had the whole voyage home to make amends. James says it has been a long time, maybe too long says Baines, they shake hands. James finds Margarita in bed ailing from a fever and chest infection from Liverpool's cold air but getting better. James shows an interest in a three-masted barque the Angelos, to transport a cargo of ivory.  He tells Dawkins that Baines is no longer with the Onedin Line. Dawkins suggests that he take the Soren Larsson with James himself as captain. Baines receives his final pay from Dawkins including the profit from his shares in the Christian Radich and Dawkins tips him off about a possible whiskey charter. Tom tells James that he is a partner with Baines and is going on the Sea Spray'''s first run. James is furious and tells him that he is in breach of his indentures and will send him on a coaling run to Swansea until he learns obedience. Tom lies to Baines and sets sail with him on the Sea Spray. Max Van Der Rheede calls on James for the repayment of his £10000 debt, sold to him by Samuel, plus £500 interest. On the way to the launch of the new Fraser ship, the William Fraser, Dunwoody lets slip that he has seen Dawkins dining with Van Der Rheede and that he is the source of the indiscretions. Tom tells Baines that he has lied to him and Baines is furious telling him that James 'owns him body and soul'. James confronts Dawkins who says that Van Der Rheede told him he only wanted to help but James dismisses him anyway. Elizabeth receives a letter from Samuel saying he is returning from abroad and that he has remarried. James repays his debt to Van Der Rheede who says he will use it to buy the Angelos. He tells James that because of his blind greed, he ruined his brother who then committed suicide and that he made a graveside vow to beggar him. James wonders why Charlotte has not responded to his or Margarita's letters. They learn that she has been away on tour singing in Music Hall. She is booked to open at The Pantheon in Liverpool performing under the name The Lancashire Nightingale. Samuel arrives with his new American bride Caroline. Her father is President of the New York Yankees Baseball team as well as a Long Island bank. Charlotte arrives and greets Caroline, mistaking her for James' wife Margarita. Samuel is furious and says 'thank you Charlotte, thank you'. In the hold of the Sea Spray a rat jumps out at the bosun causing him to drop his lamp, setting fire to the cargo of whisky. Tom tries to put out the fire but is badly burnt, Baines rescues him and they escape in the lifeboat before the ship explodes. Tragically, Tom dies from his injuries in Baines' arms.

 (E89)  
Written by Barry Thomas

Back in Liverpool, Tom Arnold is buried. Baines says 'I wanted to bury you at sea but it was not possible, you just rest nice and easy now, we'll get you a proper headstone as soon as I can afford it. I'm off to Liverpool to settle matters with James Onedin'.  Jack Pearson calls on Margarita pursuing a debt of £2000 owing for 5 months. Max Van Der Rheede calls at the office and learns that Dawkins has been sacked.  Baines calls on James but he is out. He tells Margarita that if James had treated Tom right, he wouldn't have run off and been killed. 'It will all catch up with him' he says. He says he doesn't blame her but will never forgive James, never.  Elizabeth reveals that the Queen has written a personal letter of thanks to James for rescuing the Prince of Bulgaria and that she may reward him. Van Der Rheede 'borrows' a necklace from a prostitute called Bettsie given to her by a gentleman from London. He tells Baines that he has settled the refitting debts of the Sea Spray and implies that the debt can be repaid in some other way. On board James' ship, two police officers come on board and demand to search the cabin. Samuel rings Elizabeth to say that James has been arrested for receiving stolen property; they found the necklace on the ship. If convicted he could receive up to 14 years penal servitude. Samuel tells Elizabeth he understands that Der Rheede paid off Baines' debt.  Der Rheede calls on Margarita and says is there anything he can do, insinuating that James succumbed to temptation. Samuel finds Baines and tells him James has been arrested. Baines says he suspected something was wrong as Der Rheede was being far too generous and wanted him to do something wrong in return. He says that it must have been Pendleton the cook and to look no further as he is the finest cook on the Seven Seas and the shiftiest. Der Rheede discusses the permanent removal of Bettsie for £50 to solve the problem of the missing necklace, which was in her possession. He has her sold abroad never to see Liverpool again. James is committed for trial and Der Rheede calls on Margarita to commiserate. Elizabeth tells him 'you are the vilest man I have ever known'. She tells Margarita that the worst thing that could ever befall James would be imprisonment. The episode closes with James contemplating his fate in his prison cell.

 (E90)  
Written by Simon Masters

A reward of 50 guineas is offered for Pembleton's whereabouts. Samuel says Baines could not have done it. Baines' landlady asks for his overdue rent, giving him one more week to pay. Margarita says she wants to see James, she says she was imprisoned for 8 months when she was 17 years old and had to eat the lizards and spiders that crawled over her. Charlotte calls on James. She has decided to leave the theatre. James asks her to look over his ships and give a full current appraisal. She talks to Dunwoody and Baines arrives saying he knows where Pendleton is, accepting the reward money. He has sailed for Rochelle. Margarita says she will take the fastest ship and confront him with Samuel going with her. Elizabeth receives a letter from Daniel. He has been away on a path of enlightenment studying Sufism as taught by Rumi. He is considering resigning his Ambassadorship and his seat in Parliament. It has made him realise how much he still loves Elizabeth and if she will still have him. Margarita and Samuel search for Pembleton's ship. Max van Der Rheede calls on Dunwoody and offers to buy six of their ships for £500 each. Dunwoody says you may have duped Dawkins but not me. They find Pembleton adrift after his ship is lost in the storm, but he is dead. At home, a seaman delivers a letter to Margarita from Bettsie. She was sold to a white slaver and on the ship she heard about the necklace and what Der Rheede wanted it for. She wants to see him pay for what he did to her. Samuel tells Baines to go and see James and tell him that they caught up with Pembleton. James says 'I wondered how long it would take you'. They reconcile their differences. Baines says he remembers telling Der Rheede that he was taking some charts back to the ship and that the necklace was found in one of them. Margarita visits James and offers him a gun to break out. He says he will walk out legally. At his lodgings, Baines confronts Mr. Sparrow and demands a signed confession that Der Rheede paid him to plant the necklace.  Elizabeth and Samuel confront Der Rheede showing him the statements from Sparrow and Bettsie. Samuel says if he signs a confession, they will give him two days before they notify the authorities. He agrees. The family, including Baines, celebrate James' release on bail. James is angry when he learns of the deal with Der Rheede and sets off after him together with Baines and Elizabeth. They eventually catch up with his ship and persuade the captain to give him up. Der Rheede jumps overboard to try to swim into Dutch waters, James says 'lower a boat'.

 (E91)  
Written by Mervyn Haisman

Max Van Der Rheede is imprisoned and James is a free man. Samuel discusses his supply of nitrate with James and agrees a price of £25000, payable in 6 months. Baines is told to prepare the Soren Larsson for a long trip, James reveals he is going to South America for 10–12 months. Margarita says she will go as well but James says no as they will be rounding The Horn twice and she would be an encumbrance. James tells Elizabeth he wants to sell 18 small ships to fund a few bigger ones. He has bought half a million tons of Nitrate from Samuel and he will sail out with coal and back with nitrate. James needs a further £25000 to finance his operation and Elizabeth agrees to the loan, again spread over 6 months. He says he will have 20 years to sell it at a profit of £2 million. James and Baines set sail and discover that Margarita has stowed away. Samuel has received his official nomination for parliament after being recommended by Daniel. Elizabeth asks if it is Caroline's idea for him to go into politics. Samuel asks Charlotte to dinner to discuss their children; 'we've both changed' he says. Baines says that James has made a mistake as the river is silted up and that the nearest they can get to the nitrate is by rowing boat. James reveals that he has brought timber with them to build a jetty. James turns down Alf Scrutton's offer to load the nitrate and is threatened by him, saying he will destroy the jetty if it is built. Margarita tells James she is five months pregnant. He says she will have it in Buenos Aires. Margarita bargains with the locals to build his jetty in return for ten boats. We learn that the Charlotte Rhodes'', James' first ship, has been sold as part of the liquidation of Onedin ships. Samuel has lost the election and Elizabeth receives a telegram saying that Daniel is missing at sea, presumed drowned. She is widowed for the second time. On board ship, James wakes with a premonition about her. James placates Scrutton by offering him a job for £10 a month to organise the loading of the nitrate, paid 6 months in advance. They set sail with the first load of nitrate and Margarita goes into labour. James tells Baines that he will give him all the help that he needs. A bemused Baines says he has never delivered a baby, 'neither have I' says James. Simon the cook confides that he has delivered three and successfully delivers Margarita's baby. An overjoyed James thanks him and shakes his hand. It is a boy, named Will after captain Baines. On deck James takes the wheel declaring, 'I've got a son'.

References

Lists of British period drama television series episodes